Blood urea nitrogen (BUN) is a medical test that measures the amount of urea nitrogen found in blood. The liver produces urea in the urea cycle as a waste product of the digestion of protein.  Normal human adult blood should contain 6 to 20 mg/dL (2.1 to 7.1 mmol/L) of urea nitrogen. Individual laboratories will have different reference ranges as the assay used can vary between laboratories. The test is used to detect renal problems. It is not considered as reliable as creatinine or BUN/creatinine ratio blood studies.

Interpretation
BUN is an indication of renal (kidney) health.  The normal range is 2.1–7.1 mmol/L or 6–20 mg/dL.

The main causes of an increase in BUN are: high-protein diet, decrease in glomerular filtration rate (GFR) (suggestive of kidney failure), decrease in blood volume (hypovolemia), congestive heart failure, gastrointestinal hemorrhage, fever, rapid cell destruction from infections, athletic activity, excessive muscle breakdown, and increased catabolism.

Hypothyroidism can cause both decreased GFR and hypovolemia, but BUN-to-creatinine ratio has been found to be lowered in hypothyroidism and raised in hyperthyroidism.

The main causes of a decrease in BUN are malnutrition (low protein diet), severe liver disease, anabolic state, and  syndrome of inappropriate antidiuretic hormone.

Another rare cause of a decreased BUN is ornithine transcarbamylase deficiency, which is a genetic disorder inherited in an X-linked recessive pattern. OTC deficiency is also accompanied by hyperammonemia and high orotic acid levels.

Units
BUN (urea-N) is mg/dL in the United States, Mexico, Italy, Austria, and Germany. Elsewhere, the concentration of urea is reported in SI unit as mmol/L, which is generally depending on the lab.

 represents the mass of nitrogen within urea/volume, not the mass of whole urea. Each molecule of urea has two nitrogen atoms, each of molar mass 14g/mol. To convert from mg/dL of blood urea nitrogen to mmol/L of urea:

Note that molar concentrations of urea and urea nitrogen are equal, because both nitrogen gas and urea has two nitrogen atoms.

Convert BUN to urea in mg/dL by using following formula:

Where 60 represents MW of urea and 14*2 MW of urea nitrogen.

See also
 Kt/V
 Standardized Kt/V
 Urea reduction ratio
 Urine urea nitrogen

References

Chemical pathology
Nitrogen cycle
Nephrology